The Hercule class was a late type of 100-gun ships of the line of the French Navy. They were the second strongest of four ranks of ships of the line designed by the Commission de Paris. While the first units were classical straight-walled ships of the line, next ones were gradually converted to steam, and the last one was built with an engine.

Design 
The Hercule class evolved as an enlargement of the straight-walled, 90-gun , suggested by Jean Tupinier.

With the Henri IV, a rounded stern was introduced. The next ships were built with the rounded stern, and it was retrofitted on the early units of the class.

Units 
 
Builder:
Begun:
Launched:
Completed:
Fate:

 
Builder:
Begun:
Launched:
Completed:
Fate:

 
Builder:
Begun:
Launched:
Completed:
Fate:

 
Builder:Cherbourg
Begun:1829
Launched:1848
Completed:1850
Fate: Bombardment of Odessa (1854). Lost in a storm at Eupatoria in the Crimea (14.11.1854)

 
Builder:
Begun:
Launched:
Completed:
Fate:

 
Builder:
Begun:
Launched:
Completed:
Fate:

 Annibal, renamed Prince Jérôme
Builder:
Begun:
Launched:
Completed:
Fate:

 
Builder:
Begun:
Launched:
Completed:
Fate:

 
Builder:
Begun:
Launched:
Completed:
Fate:

 , Lys renamed 1830
Builder:Rochefort
Begun:1825
Launched:
Completed:
Fate: Bombardment at Kinburn (1855)

 , Bucentaure renamed 1839
Builder:Lorient
Begun:1833
Launched:
Completed:
Fate: Bombardment at Kinburn (1855)

 
Builder:
Begun:
Launched:
Completed:
Fate:

 
Builder:
Begun:
Launched:
Completed:
Fate:

Notes and references

References

Bibliography 
 

100-gun ship of the line classes
Ship of the line classes from France
 
Ship classes of the French Navy